Umm-Salma may refer to:

 Táhirih, a title of Fatimah Baraghani (1814 or 1817 – 1852), an influential poet and theologian of the Bábí faith in Iran
 Umm Salama or Hind bint Abi Umayya (c. 596 – c. 680), one of Muhammad's wives